"Respiration" is a song by American rappers Mos Def and Talib Kweli, collectively known as Black Star. It was released as the second single from the duo’s eponymously titled 1998 album (see 1998 in music). It features a guest verse from fellow American rapper Common and guitar playing by DeChown Jenkins. The song’s production was handled by Hi-Tek, who sampled "The Fox" as performed by Don Randi. In addition, the song's introduction samples a monologue from the hip hop documentary Style Wars. It is found on Best of Decade I: 1995-2005, a compilation of Rawkus Records' best songs. It can also be found on Howie B's compilation album Another Late Night: Howie B. The single reached #54 on the Billboard Hot R&B/Hip-Hop Songs chart.

Two remixes were made for "Respiration": 'Flying High Mix' contains production by Pete Rock and a verse by Black Thought of The Roots. Another remix found on the Hip Hop Classics Vol. 1 compilation album also features Pete Rock production, but has a guest verse by Common instead of Black Thought.

Single track list

A-Side
 "Respiration (Album Version Radio Edit)"
 "Respiration (Album Version Instrumental)"

B-Side
 "Respiration (Flying High Radio Mix)"
 "Respiration (Flying High Main Mix)"
 "Respiration (Flying High Instrumental)"

See also
List of Talib Kweli songs
List of Mos Def songs
List of Common songs

References

1999 singles
Black Star (group) songs
Common (rapper) songs
Songs written by Common (rapper)
Songs written by Mos Def
1998 songs
Black-and-white music videos
Songs written by Talib Kweli
Songs written by Hi-Tek
Songs about New York City
Songs about Chicago